John Herman Koch (July 24, 1864August 28, 1929) was an American politician and minister. He served in the Wisconsin State Assembly.

Biography
A German emigrant Koch was born on July 24, 1864.  He settled with his parents near Mayville, Wisconsin in 1870 and in Hartland, Shawano County, Wisconsin in 1873. Koch later became a Lutheran minister and missionary. He died on August 28, 1929 in Milwaukee County, Wisconsin and was buried in Milwaukee, Wisconsin.

Political career
Koch was elected to the Assembly in 1922. He was a Republican.

References

External links

Wisconsin Historical Society

People from Mayville, Wisconsin
People from Shawano County, Wisconsin
People from Milwaukee County, Wisconsin
Republican Party members of the Wisconsin State Assembly
Religious leaders from Wisconsin
20th-century Lutheran clergy
19th-century Lutheran clergy
American Lutheran missionaries
1864 births
1929 deaths
Burials in Wisconsin